The 1964 UC Riverside Highlanders football team represented the University of California, Riverside as an independent during the 1964 NCAA College Division football season. Led by Gil Allan in his first and only season as head coach, UC Riverside compiled a record of 2–7. The team was outscored by its opponents 213 to 54 for the season. The Highlanders played home games at UCR Athletic Field in Riverside, California.

Schedule

Notes

References

UC Riverside
UC Riverside Highlanders football seasons
UC Riverside Highlanders football